Pine Hill is a Mennonite village in Toledo District, Belize, some 15 km north of the district capital Punta Gorda.

Pine Hill is a daughter colony of the Upper Barton Creek settlement. It was founded around 1997. It is home to very conservative Mennonites, who belong to the Noah Hoover branch of Old Order Mennonites. 

The community makes a living of farming, of cheese and other dairy production and of wood working. They also raise cattle and keep bees for honey production. There is also horse powered saw mill at Pine Hill.

In 2010 Pine Hill had a population of 205 people in 39 households.

See also 
Mennonites in Belize

References 

Populated places in Toledo District